Gary Vernon Lauk,  (born September 7, 1940 – November 21, 2022) was a lawyer and former political figure in British Columbia. He represented Vancouver Centre in the Legislative Assembly of British Columbia from 1972 to 1986 as a New Democratic Party (NDP) member. He has practised criminal law, personal injury law, commercial law, and insurance litigation. Gary V. Lauk was awarded a Queens Counsel (QC).

He is the son of Edward Lauk. Gary Lauk was educated in Vancouver, New Westminster and at the University of British Columbia. He served in the provincial cabinet as Minister of Industrial Development, Trade and Commerce and as Minister of Economic Development and as Minister Mines and Petroleum Resources. Lauk resigned his seat in 1986 to allow Mike Harcourt to be elected to the assembly. He was a member of the board of the Trial Lawyers of B.C. and of the board of Corpus Christi College at UBC. Laub died on November 21, 2022.

References 

1940 births
2022 deaths
British Columbia New Democratic Party MLAs
Canadian King's Counsel
Lawyers in British Columbia
Members of the Executive Council of British Columbia
Peter A. Allard School of Law alumni
Politicians from Vancouver